The 2012–13 UEFA Europa League play-off round was the last of four rounds of matches prior to the tournament's group stage, and decided 31 of the 48 teams that would participate in the group stage.

All times are CEST (UTC+2).

Round and draw dates
All draws were held at UEFA headquarters in Nyon, Switzerland.

Matches could also be played on Tuesdays or Wednesdays instead of the regular Thursdays due to scheduling conflicts.

Format
Each tie was played over two legs, with each team playing one leg at home. The team that scored more goals on aggregate over the two legs advanced to the next round. In the event that aggregate score finished level, the away goals rule would be applied, i.e., the team that scored more goals away from home over the two legs advanced. If away goals were also equal, then thirty minutes of extra time would be played, divided into two fifteen-minutes halves. The away goals rule would again be applied after extra time, i.e., if there were goals scored during extra time and the aggregate score was still level, the visiting team would advance by virtue of more away goals scored. If no goals were scored during extra time, the tie would be decided by penalty shootout.

In the draws for each round, teams were seeded based on their 2012 UEFA club coefficients, with the teams divided into seeded and unseeded pots. A seeded team was drawn against an unseeded team, with the order of legs in each tie decided randomly. Due to the limited time between matches, the draws for the second and third qualifying rounds took place before the results of the previous round were known. The seeding in these draws (or in any cases where the results of a tie in the previous round were not known at the time of draw) was carried out under the assumption that the higher-ranked teams of the previous round would advance to this round, which means if a lower-ranked team were to advance, it would simply take the seeding of its defeated opponent. Prior to the draws, UEFA may form "groups" in accordance with the principles set by the Club Competitions Committee, but they were purely for convenience of the draw and for ensuring that teams from the same association were not drawn against each other, and did not resemble any real groupings in the sense of the competition.

Play-off round

Seeding

Notes
† Winners of the previous round whose identity was not known at the time of the draw, due to the abandonment of the second leg between Dila Gori and Anorthosis (Dila Gori was later declared as the winner, thus effectively taking the coefficient of Anorthosis, who has a higher coefficient, in the draw for this round)

Matches

|}

Notes
Note 1: Order of legs reversed after original draw.

First leg

Notes
Note 2: Anzhi Makhachkala played their home match at Lokomotiv Stadium, Moscow instead of their regular stadium, Dynamo Stadium, Makhachkala, due to security issues involving the city of Makhachkala and the autonomous republic of Dagestan.
Note 3: Neftchi Baku played their home match at Dalga Arena, Baku instead of their regular stadium, Ismat Gayibov Stadium, Baku.
Note 4: Ekranas played their home match at LFF Stadium, Vilnius instead of their regular stadium, Aukštaitija Stadium, Panevėžys.
Note 5: Dinamo București played their home match at Arena Națională, Bucharest instead of their regular stadium, Stadionul Dinamo, Bucharest, as it had greater capacity.
Note 6: F91 Dudelange played their home match at Stade Municipal de Differdange, Differdange instead of their regular stadium, Stade Jos Nosbaum, Dudelange.
Note 7: Debrecen played their home match at Városi Stadion, Nyíregyháza instead of their regular stadium, Stadion Oláh Gábor Út, Debrecen.
Note 8: Lokeren played their home match at King Baudouin Stadium, Brussels instead of their regular stadium, Daknamstadion, Lokeren.
Note 9: Vaslui played their home match at Stadionul Ceahlăul, Piatra Neamț instead of their regular stadium, Stadionul Municipal, Vaslui.
Note 10: Mura 05 played their home match at Ljudski vrt, Maribor instead of their regular stadium, Fazanerija City Stadium, Murska Sobota.
Note 11: Zeta played their home match at Stadion Pod Goricom, Podgorica instead of their regular stadium, Stadion Trešnjica, Golubovci.

Second leg

Stuttgart won 3–1 on aggregate.

Marítimo won 3–0 on aggregate.

Dnipro Dnipropetrovsk won 6–4 on aggregate.

Neftchi Baku won 4–2 on aggregate.

Athletic Bilbao won 9–3 on aggregate.

Molde won 4–1 on aggregate.

Hapoel Tel Aviv won 7–1 on aggregate.

AIK won 2–1 on aggregate.

Rosenborg won 3–2 on aggregate.

PSV won 14–0 on aggregate.

Young Boys won 3–2 on aggregate.

Sparta Prague won 4–2 on aggregate.

Steaua București won 5–0 on aggregate.

Metalist Kharkiv won 4–1 on aggregate.

Genk won 3–2 on aggregate.

2–2 on aggregate. Viktoria Plzeň won on away goals.

Club Brugge won 7–1 on aggregate.

Marseille won 2–1 on aggregate.

0–0 on aggregate. Videoton won 4–2 on penalties.

Bordeaux won 3–2 on aggregate.

3–3 on aggregate. Partizan won on away goals.

Internazionale won 4–2 on aggregate.

Hannover 96 won 10–4 on aggregate.

Levante won 3–0 on aggregate.

Rapid Wien won 4–2 on aggregate.

Anzhi Makhachkala won 6–0 on aggregate.

Newcastle United won 2–1 on aggregate.

Lazio won 5–1 on aggregate.

Twente won 5–4 on aggregate.

Liverpool won 2–1 on aggregate.

Sporting CP won 6–1 on aggregate.

Notes
Note 12: Dila Gori played their home match at Mikheil Meskhi Stadium, Tbilisi instead of their regular stadium, Tengiz Burjanadze Stadium, Gori.

References

External links
2012–13 UEFA Europa League, UEFA.com

2
UEFA Europa League qualifying rounds